Thomas James Robson (January 15, 1946 – April 20, 2021) was an American Major League Baseball player, coach and author. He played first baseman and designated hitter for two seasons for the Texas Rangers. He is author of The Hitting Edge.

Personal life
Robson was born January 15, 1946, in Rochester, New York. He attended Camelback High School in Phoenix, Arizona. He attended Phoenix College, a community college, and later Utah State University in Logan. He was drafted by the New York Mets in the 50th round of the 1967 amateur draft.

His nephew is Major League third baseman Mike Moustakas.

On April 20, 2021, Robson died of natural causes, aged 75.

Professional baseball career
He played for the Texas Rangers for six games during the 1974 season and 17 games during the 1975 season. After batting .320 with 13 home runs with the Spokane Indians, he was acquired by the New York Yankees from the Rangers organization at the Winter Meetings on December 9, 1975. After retiring, he became a coach in the Rangers' organization. He spent seven years on the coaching staff of Rangers' manager Bobby Valentine, followed Valentine back to Japan to coach with the Chiba Lotte Marines  and then followed him again to New York join his staff as the hitting instructor and, later, bench coach for the Mets. He served as the Cincinnati Reds' hitting coach for the first four months of the  campaign under Bob Boone. In , he returned to Japan and reunited with Valentine to coach for the Chiba Lotte Marines.

References

External links

1946 births
2021 deaths
American expatriate baseball players in Japan
American expatriate baseball players in Mexico
Asheville Tourists managers
Baseball players from New York (state)
Cincinnati Reds coaches
Diablos Rojos del México players
Durham Bulls players
Jacksonville Suns players
Major League Baseball bench coaches
Major League Baseball first basemen
Major League Baseball hitting coaches
Mankato Mets players
Memphis Blues players
Nankai Hawks players
New York Mets coaches
New York Mets scouts
Nippon Professional Baseball infielders
Pacific Coast League MVP award winners
Pittsfield Rangers players
Spokane Indians players
Sportspeople from Rochester, New York
Texas Rangers coaches
Texas Rangers players
Trois-Rivières Aigles players
Utah State Aggies baseball players
Visalia Mets players
West Palm Beach Expos players